Noura Rahal (born 1973) is a Lebanese/Syrian singer from Damascus, who has also had brief acting stints.

Rahal was born to a Lebanese father and Syrian mother in Syria.

Personal life
Rahal married a Greek businessman, with whom she had two sons. She later married again in 2012.

She survived breast cancer due to an early diagnosis in 2007.

References

External links

1973 births
Syrian Christians
21st-century Syrian women singers
Syrian people of Lebanese descent
Lebanese people of Syrian descent
Living people
Syrian television actresses
People from Damascus
21st-century Syrian actresses